CIFN-FM was a radio station which broadcast a First Nations community radio programming on the frequency of 106.5 FM/MHz in Island Lake, Saskatchewan, Canada.

Owned by Island Lake First Nations Radio Inc., the station received CRTC approval on January 10, 2011. Its licence was renewed in 2017 but only on condition of presenting several years of annual returns and implementing Alert Ready, and the station was thereafter deleted from databases.

References

External links

IFN
Cree culture
Radio stations established in 2011
2011 establishments in Saskatchewan
IFN
Radio stations disestablished in 2017
2017 disestablishments in Saskatchewan
IFN